George of Syracuse (born Georgy Vasilyevich Tarassov,  April 14, 1893 in Voronezh, Russia – March 22, 1981 in Paris, France) was an Eastern Orthodox archbishop of the Ecumenical Patriarchate who led the Patriarchal Exarchate for Orthodox Parishes of Russian Tradition in Western Europe from 1960 to 1981.

A chemical engineer by training, Tarassov settled in Belgium in 1919. He was ordained deacon in 1928 by Metropolitan Eulogius (Georgiyevsky) of Paris, and priest in 1930.  He served as rector of various parishes in Belgium, including Brussels from 1940. In 1953 he was consecrated as auxiliary bishop under Metropolitan. Vladimir (Tikhonicky), with responsibility for parishes in Benelux and Germany. Archbishop George was elected to lead the exarchate after the death of Vladimir in 1959.

External links 
OrthodoxWiki Georges (Tarassoff) of Syracuse
 Biography

1893 births
1981 deaths
People from Voronezh
Archbishops of Orthodox parishes of Russian tradition in Western Europe